Springs Boys' High School  is a high school in Springs, Gauteng, South Africa.

Principals  
Claude Mullan (1940–1960)
Harold Marston (1961–1975)
Jaap Liebenberg (1975–1981)
Bob Gouldie (1982–1993)
André French (1994–2016)
Diane Freeman (July 2017–present)

Extramural Activities

Coat of Arms

The badge, designed in 1940, has three sub-divisions in it. The first division is the Southern Cross. The second division is taken from the municipal coat-of-arms, symbolizing water and gold. The third is the lamp of knowledge, which symbolizes the striving for continuous academic excellence.

Notable alumni  
 Rudi Bryson - Cricket (Easterns, Northern Transvaal, Northerns, South Africa, Surrey)
 Dave Charlton - Racing Driver (Formula One Grand Prix)
 Bobby Cole (golfer)
 Junior Dala - Cricket (Easterns, The Unlimited Titans, South Africa A)
 DJ Cleo - DJ (Kwaito & House Producer), Will of Steel Productions
 Ben Filmalter - Mugg & Bean founder
 Dean Hall (rugby player)
 Vincent Moore - Cricket (Easterns, Titans, u/21 South Africa)

References

External links

High schools in South Africa
Schools in Gauteng
Educational institutions established in 1940
1940 establishments in South Africa